Lebert is a surname. Notable people with the surname include:

Benjamin Lebert (born 1982), German author
Helmut Lebert (born 1941), German rower
Hermann Lebert (1813–1878), German physician
Sigmund Lebert (1821–1884), German pianist

See also
Liebert (surname)
Libert (disambiguation)